The Treaty of Coche was an agreement that formally established the end of the Federal War in Venezuela.

The name of the treaty originates from the fact that it was made at the estate of Coche, in that period very close to Caracas, and today part of the Parish of Coche in Caracas. The agreement was initially made on April 23, 1863 between Pedro José Rojas, Secretary General of the Supreme Chief of the Republic: José Antonio Páez, and Antonio Guzmán Blanco, Secretary General of the Provisional President of the Federation: Juan Crisóstomo Falcón, and later confirmed by both Páez and Falcón on May 25, 1863.

Federal War
Treaties of Venezuela

References